The Last of the Mohicans is a 1932 American pre-Code Mascot movie serial based on the 1826 novel The Last of the Mohicans by James Fenimore Cooper.

Cast
Harry Carey as Natty Bumppo/Hawkeye
Hobart Bosworth as Chingachgook, 'the Sagamore'
Junior Coghlan as Uncas
Edwina Booth as Cora Munro
Lucile Browne as Alice Munro
Walter Miller as Major Duncan Heyward
Bob Kortman as Magua
Walter McGrail as Dulac, the French spy
Nelson McDowell as David Gamut; McDowell also played the part of David Gamut in the 1920 silent film of the same name
Edward Hearn as Colonel Munro
Mischa Auer as General Montcalm
Yakima Canutt as Black Fox (and other supporting roles)

Production
The Last of the Mohicans was adapted from the novel by James Fenimore Cooper.

Chapter titles
 Wild Waters
 Flaming Arrows
 Rifle or Tomahawk
 Riding with Death
 Red Shadows
 Lure of Gold
 Crimson Trail
 Tide of Battle
 Redskins' Honor
 The Enemy's Stronghold
 Paleface Magic
 End of the Trail
Source:

See also
 List of film serials by year
 List of film serials by studio

References

External links

1932 films
American black-and-white films
1930s English-language films
Films based on Western (genre) novels
Films based on The Last of the Mohicans
Films directed by B. Reeves Eason
Films directed by Ford Beebe
Mascot Pictures film serials
1930s action adventure films
American action adventure films
Films produced by Nat Levine
1930s American films